Robert M. Durling was an American scholar and translator, known for his translations of Petrarch's Rime Sparse and (with Ronald Martinez) of Dante Alighieri's Divine Comedy. He was professor emeritus of Italian and English literature at the University of California, Santa Cruz.  He died on May 21, 2015.

Durling was a student of Charles S. Singleton and took his course on the Comedy, a class he said "literally changed my life."

Bibliography
The Figure of the Poet in Renaissance Epic. Cambridge: Harvard UP, 1966.
Time and the Crystal: Studies in Dante's Rime Petrose (with Ronald L. Martinez). Berkeley and Los Angeles: U of California P, 1990.

References

External links
Robert M. Durling at U of California, Santa Cruz

Living people
University of California, Santa Cruz faculty
American translators
Italian–English translators
Translators of Dante Alighieri
Year of birth missing (living people)